Jacob Lee Epstein (born January 16, 1987) is a Canadian actor and singer. He played Craig Manning, a musician with bipolar disorder, on Degrassi: The Next Generation. He also played Will in the First National Tour of American Idiot, and originated the role of Gerry Goffin in the Broadway production of Beautiful: The Carole King Musical.

Early life 
Epstein was born in Toronto, Ontario, Canada. His mother Kathy Kacer is a Norma Fleck Award-winning writer of children's stories about the Holocaust; and his father Ian Epstein (born 1955) is a lawyer. He has an older sister, Gabi, an actress and jazz singer. Epstein is Jewish, and was raised in Conservative Judaism. Epstein stated in 2019, "I would consider myself spiritually Jewish rather than religiously Jewish. It was certainly a big part of my upbringing and certainly a big part of my identity."

Career 

Epstein made his professional stage debut in a Soulpepper Theatre Company production of Our Town at the Royal Alexandra Theatre (May 7 - June 19, 1999) before playing the Artful Dodger in Mirvish Productions' stage production of Oliver! (Nov. 2, 1999 - Jan. 2, 2000). After appearing on the TV show The Zack Files, he played Craig Manning on Degrassi: The Next Generation for five seasons and won the Gemini Award. The character of Craig became a musician on the show and had to cope with parental abuse and bipolar disorder. Epstein said, "At the time, mental illness was not really something anyone was talking about. There was a huge stigma attached — I had never seen [bipolar disorder] on TV, and certainly not in a teenager. I loved the opportunity to portray someone who was conflicted and not perfect..." Craig impregnated a girl named Manny who gets an abortion, and Epstein noted that those episodes were "initially banned" in the United States. Epstein indicated that he "got the chance to really flesh out this guy that felt like a darker extension of me."

He left Degrassi during the fifth season to attend the National Theatre School of Canada in Montreal and made theater his new focus. Epstein said, "One of the things I love about theatre is how raw it is. There's no faking it… I really wanted to have a base in theatre, and that kind of opened up all these doors for me." Epstein returned to Degrassi for minor guest appearances in season 6-8. He replaced Kyle Riabko as Melchior Gabor in the First National Tour of Spring Awakening, officially beginning his run on July 7, 2009.  Epstein commented on the show, "I think it really doesn't talk down to its audience. I think it portrays teen sexuality in a way that's real, in a way that's entertaining, and in a way that's just really connects with people. Spring Awakening really doesn't hold back, and I think people appreciate that."

Also in 2009, Epstein starred as CB (a.k.a. Charlie Brown) in Dog Sees God: Confessions of a Teenage Blockhead, described as a "comedic deconstruction of the famous Peanuts characters." In this production, CB copes with the recent death of his beagle and discovers that he is in love with Beethoven (a.k.a. Schroeder).  Theatre critic Richard Ouzounian wrote, "Jake Epstein is brilliant as CB, a bunch of nerve endings searching for a place to settle. Epstein is so beautifully open and honest that you go with him on every step of his journey."

In July 2011, Epstein played Billy's older brother in a Toronto production of Billy Elliot the Musical. He spoke about working with alternate leads, "The most unique part of this show is working with a new Billy every night. Every Billy is different. They each bring something interesting and specific to the role. I am a different older brother each night, depending on who's on..."

He played Will in Green Day's Tony-winning rock musical American Idiot during the 2011–2012 North American tour. Epstein said, "I always think of American Idiot as my generation's The Who's Tommy or Pink Floyd's The Wall. American Idiot was very much like that time in the world, right after Sept. 11th...It was like a time of not knowing what to feel and that's what spawned this show." In a 2013 interview, Epstein identified Will as the most challenging role he had ever played. He said, "I sat on a couch and never left the stage for the majority of the show. That experience was a whole lesson in pacing, in creating a whole world for yourself on stage, and in letting the experience you are having that night dictate your arc for the show."

Epstein made his Broadway debut in Spider-Man: Turn Off the Dark as the alternate for lead role Peter Parker/Spider-Man. He joined the company on December 4, 2012, and performed Saturday and Sunday matinees, with his first show taking place on December 8 at the Foxwoods Theatre. Epstein referred to the role as a "childhood fantasy come true." He played his final performance on August 12, 2013, to begin rehearsing for a new musical titled Beautiful: The Carole King Musical, which opened on Broadway on January 12, 2014. This marked his second Broadway show in less than a year. The musical was based on Carole King's life, and Epstein portrayed her former husband Gerry Goffin. He noted that it was not easy playing the man who broke King's heart. Epstein said that "...it was tough, because Goffin was alive at the time. I was in touch with Carole King, who kept encouraging me, 'Do everything you can not to make him the villain.'" Beautiful had undergone major script changes and the version of Goffin that appeared in the final show was different from the part that Epstein had first auditioned for. Epstein said, "I'm trying to make his struggle clear, so people understand why he did the things he did. He's not just a villain. I hope people see it's more complicated than that." He remained with the cast until September 21, 2014.

Many of the characters Epstein portrayed were troubled types. He said in December 2013, "I'm a pretty upbeat person. I think I sometimes get cast as these brooding types because I bring light and joy, which hopefully makes them more likable."

Epstein played "geeky FBI computer nerd" Chuck Russink in the American TV show Designated Survivor (2016–2018). It was cancelled by ABC after two seasons, and he was no longer in the show when it was picked up and aired by Netflix for a third season.

In 2016, Epstein starred as a closeted gay man in the off-Broadway show Straight. He said of the script: Critic Michael Glitz described Epstein's performance as "immensely appealing" and wrote that the three-member cast "elevated the show considerably with their charm and chemistry, led by Epstein's increasingly substantial stage chops." New York Times critic Andy Webster wrote, "Mr. Epstein ably embodies a vaguely passive-aggressive, noncommittal male archetype."

In July 2019, Epstein debuted his original one act autobiographical show Boy Falls From the Sky: Jake Epstein Live at Supermarket at the 2019 Toronto Fringe Festival. The show in part detailed his experiences on Broadway with the title referring to his time performing in Spider-Man: Turn Off the Dark. Reviewer Wayne Leung described the show as "pitch-perfect." He wrote, "Epstein carries the solo show with a casual ease, as if he were regaling a group of friends over beers at a bar. He is affable, down-to-earth, and his narrative is sprinkled with gentle self-deprecating humour." Epstein said that his wife Vanessa Smythe got him "to realize that there's nothing like somebody with a microphone, telling a true story, something that's funny or horrific or whatever. There's so much power in that."

In December 2019, Epstein starred in the world premiere of the play Dear Jack, Dear Louise, inspired by playwright Ken Ludwig's parents. He played Army doctor Jack Ludwig, who exchanges letters with an aspiring Broadway actress during World War II. Epstein said, "One of the things that drew me to this project was that for my wife and I, the first five years of our relationship was long distance." He described Dear Jack, Dear Louise as "a wink to the original form of online dating." Critic Thomas Floyd wrote, "Epstein plays Jack with bookish likability and a nervous smile, even as the war erodes his optimism." Critic Em Skow wrote, "...Jack's character was the truest example in the show of Ken Ludwig's propensity to use humor in order to help us absorb serious moments, and Epstein's deft fluidity in finding the balance between those opposing dispositions was outstanding."

Discography 
"My Window" — Music from Degrassi: The Next Generation
"Rescue You" — Degrassi Goes Hollywood: Music from the Original Movie
"Swan Song" — Degrassi Goes Hollywood: Music from the Original Movie

Filmography

Film

Television

Stage

References

External links 

1987 births
Living people
21st-century Canadian male actors
Canadian male child actors
Canadian male film actors
Canadian male singers
Canadian male television actors
Canadian male voice actors
Canadian Screen Award winners
Jewish Canadian male actors
Jewish Canadian musicians
Jewish singers
Male actors from Toronto
Musicians from Toronto
National Theatre School of Canada alumni